Britte Edwin Hughey (April 28, 1910 – January 27, 1986) was an American farmer and politician who served in the Mississippi House of Representatives. Elected twice from Amite County, he was a member of the local Farm Bureau and white supremacist Citizens' Council.

Election history
Hughey was elected in 1955 and 1959 alongside Frank Wall and E. H. Hurst, respectively. In 1963, Amite was apportioned only one seat in the House, and Wall defeated him for the Democratic nomination.

References

External links
 

Democratic Party members of the Mississippi House of Representatives
1910 births
1986 deaths
Farmers from Mississippi
20th-century American politicians